Rinodina atrocinerea is a species of lichen belonging to the family Physciaceae.

It is native to Europe and Northern America.

References

Caliciales
Lichen species
Lichens of Europe
Lichens of North America
Lichens described in 1833
Taxa named by William Jackson Hooker